Summer K. Mersinger is an American attorney who serves as a commissioner of the Commodity Futures Trading Commission.

Education 
Mersinger earned a Bachelor of Arts degree from the University of Minnesota and a Juris Doctor from the Columbus School of Law at the Catholic University of America.

Career 
From 1999 to 2002, Mersinger worked as an executive assistant in the United States House of Representatives. She then joined the office of Senator John Thune, serving as director of scheduling in 2004, executive director from 2004 to 2008, and deputy chief of staff from 2012 to 2020. After leaving Thune's office, Mersinger served as chief of staff to Commissioner Dawn Stump.

In December 2021, President Joe Biden announced his intent to nominate Mersinger as a commissioner of the Commodity Futures Trading Commission. She was confirmed by the United States Senate on March 28, 2022, and sworn in on March 31.

References 

Living people
University of Minnesota alumni
Columbus School of Law alumni
Commodity Futures Trading Commission personnel
Year of birth missing (living people)